Dominik Raschner (born 23 August 1994) is an Austrian World Cup alpine ski racer. He specializes in the technical events of slalom and giant slalom.

Career
Raschner achieved his first podium, by finishing 2nd in the parallel-G in Lech in November 2021.

World Cup results

Season standings

Race podiums
 0 wins
 1 podium – (1 PG); 2 top tens

World Championship results

References

External links

Austrian Ski Team – official site – Dominik Raschner – 

1994 births
Living people
Sportspeople from Innsbruck